The Watson Family are an American family of nine sibling actors who are known as "the first family of Hollywood." They were initially active as child actors in silent motion picture films.

Since August 2022, Garry Watson (b. 1928) has been the only living sibling from the family.
and since the death of silent film star/model Mildred Kornman and Donnie "Beezer" Smith, may be the last surviving actor of the Hollywood silent film era.

Biography
When Mack Sennett's Keystone Studios, located just 600 feet from the Watson family home, required child actors for films, the father Canadian American J. C "Coy" Watson Sr. provided his children for casting. The Watson children worked with many big stars in the early Hollywood era, such as James Stewart, Lionel Barrymore, Fred Astaire, Shirley Temple, Katharine Hepburn and Henry Fonda. All six Watson brothers worked as press, newsreel and television photographers during their adult careers.

One of the siblings Delmar Watson stated in the Los Angeles Times in 1968 "The study knew we had kids of all sizes, so when they needed a kid for one of there pictures, they grabbed on of us, and soon we where all working steadily"

Legacy
The family members were collectively honored with a star on the Hollywood Walk of Fame, located at 6674 Hollywood Blvd. in Hollywood, California on April 22, 1999. Billy, Garry, and Louise were interviewed in July, 2017 about their experiences in Hollywood.

The Watson Family's relatives (parents, grandparents and uncles)

The Watson family's grandfather, James Watson, was a photographer who took photos of Buffalo Bill on Broadway in 1904.

His son, J.C. (James Caughey) "Coy" Watson Sr. (born Ontario, Canada, April 14, 1890 – May 23, 1968), was a journeyman plasterer, who became a horse breaker for cowboy star Buck Jones and rented mounts to stars Hoot Gibson and Tom Mix, before getting into the special effects department, and became notable for designing The Flying Carpet that Douglas Fairbanks rode in the 1924 film The Thief of Bagdad, he married Golda Gladdis Wimer (1893–1979) on September 23, 1910. Their nine children went on to act in over 1,000 films, starting out as toddlers and child stars.

The eldest of the siblings, Coy Watson Jr., authored the book The Keystone Kid.

The Watson's uncle George Watson was the first full time photographer for the Los Angeles Mirror and opened "Acme Studio Pictures"

The Watson Family siblings
(* Highlighted in blue is still living)

References